Miles v European Schools (2011) C-196/09 is an EU law case, concerning preliminary references to the Court of Justice of the European Union.

Facts
The Complaints Board of European Schools (set up under an international agreement between different member states and the EU, the European Schools Convention) sought to make a preliminary reference to the Court of Justice, and the question was whether it could do so under TFEU article 267.

Judgment
The Court of Justice, Grand Chamber held that the Complaints Board of European Schools was a court, but not of a member state. This was different from the Benelux Court.

See also

European Union law

Notes

References
[2011] 3 Common Market Law Reports 25
Sarah Schadendorf, Der Begriff des mitgliedstaatlichen Gerichts, Anmerkung zu EuGH, Urteil v. 14.6.2011 – C-196/09 (Paul Miles u. a./Europäische Schulen) (2011) 22 Europäische Zeitschrift für Wirtschaftsrecht 670 to 674 (No 17) Catalogue
Lentzis Dimosthenis, "Τα όρια της διασταλτικής ερμηνείας και η έννοια του δικαστηρίου κράτους μέλους στο άρθρο 267 ΣLΕΕ: Σχόλιο στη ΔΕΕ 14.6.2011, C-196/09 Miles και λοιποί" (2011) 65 Αρμενόπουλος [Armenopoulos] 2076 to 2081 (No 12) [Thessaloniki Bar Review, published by the Thessaloniki Bar Association] Catatlogue
Laurent Coutron, "Chronique Droit du contentieux de l'Union européenne: Le refus d'assimiler la Chambre de recours des écoles européennes à une juridiction d'un des Etats membres" (2011) Revue Trimestrielle de Droit Européen 817 (No 4) Catalogue
Costa and Peers. Steiner & Woods EU Law. Thirteenth Edition. Oxford University Press. 2017. Pages 228 and 229.
Hartley. The Foundations of European Union Law. Eighth Edition. Oxford University Press. 2014. Pages 290 and 294.
Solanke. EU Law. Second Edition. Cambridge University Press. 2023. Page 182.
Lasok's European Court Practice and Procedure. Third Edition. Bloomsbury Professional. 2017. Paragraphs 2.183 and 17.72 at pages 274 and 1261. 

Marton Varju. European Union Human Rights Law. Edward Elgar. 2014. p 146.

External links

Court of Justice of the European Union case law
2011 in case law
European Schools (intergovernmental organisation)
Education case law